Harry Shepherd is an American former Negro league outfielder who played in the 1930s.

Shepherd played for the Indianapolis ABCs in 1938. In seven recorded games, he posted two hits in 17 plate appearances.

References

External links
Baseball statistics and player information from Baseball-Reference Black Baseball Stats and Seamheads

Year of birth missing
Place of birth missing
Indianapolis ABCs (1938) players
Date of birth missing
Date of death missing
Baseball outfielders